Park Square in downtown Boston, Massachusetts is bounded by Stuart, Charles Street South, Boylston, and Arlington Streets. It is the home of the Boston Four Seasons Hotel, the Boston Park Plaza, and nearly a dozen restaurants. To the north across Boylston Street is the Boston Public Garden.  To the east is the Washington Street Theatre District. The Bay Village neighborhood is to the south, and Back Bay is to the west.

At one time, the terminus of the Boston and Providence Railroad was in the square; however, after South Station opened, the terminal was closed. A statue commemorating US emancipation of slaves was installed in Park Square in 1879 and removed in December 2020. From 1964 to 1974, the University of Massachusetts Boston campus was located in Park Square.

A small street in the district was renamed "Park Plaice" in honor of Legal Sea Foods, a local restaurant.

Education
Boston Public Schools operates area district public schools.

Boston Renaissance Charter Public School was formerly located in a building in Park Square. In 2010 it moved to its current location in Hyde Park.

Image gallery

See also
 Park Square Theatre, Boston (1915–1921)
 Boston Theater District
 Combat Zone, Boston

References

External links

  Google news archive. Articles about Park Square.
 The Evolution of Park Square
 Picture: "Pre-war New England Greyhound PDG-3701 backed in the old Park Square Greyhound Terminal in Boston."
 Picture: "A shot of an Almeida Aerocoach loading at their terminal just a few doors away."
 Picture: "The picture of the MacKenzie Line Beck loading shows the Greyhound Terminal off to the right."

Squares in Boston
Boston Theater District
Back Bay, Boston